Almirantazgo may refer to:

Almirantazgo Fjord, in Chile
Yakutat Bay, in Alaska